Mariana Chirilă (née Stănescu; born 7 September 1964) is a Romanian female distance runner who competed in events ranging from 800 metres to the marathon. Individually she won gold medals in the 3000 metres at the 1986 Goodwill Games and the 1992 Balkan Athletics Championships, and won the senior race at the Balkan Cross Country Championships in 1985. She represented her country at the European Athletics Championships in 1986, twice at the Universiade (1987 and 1991), and twice at the IAAF World Women's Road Race Championships (1984 and 1990). Her highest global ranking was eighth in the 3000 m for the 1986 season.

Chirilă had most of her success with Romanian women's teams at international events in cross country and road running. She was a seven-time participant at the IAAF World Cross Country Championships from 1985 to 1997, including team bronze medals in 1985 (alongside Fița Lovin, Elena Fidatov, and Olympic champion Paula Ivan) and 1996 (alongside Gabriela Szabo, Fidatov and Iulia Olteanu). She ran three times at the European Cross Country Championships and scored points to bring Romania to the team title with Fidatov and Margareta Keszeg in 1994, as well as a team silver with Fidatov and Stela Olteanu in 1997. She had much success at the Balkan Cross Country Championships, taking the individual gold in 1985, silver in 1986, 1987 and 1994, as well as perfect-score team titles in all those years with runners including Fidatov, Ivan and Luminita Gogirlea.

In road running, Chirilă competed many times for Romania in ekiden marathon relays. She won minor team medals at three consecutive editions of the IAAF World Road Relay Championships from 1994 to 1998, sharing the honours with Daniela Petrescu, Alina Gherasim, Anuța Cătună, Florina Pană and Olympic champion Constantina Diță among others. Other outings in the marathon relay resulted in victories at the International Chiba Ekiden and Barcelona Ekiden in 1990 and second place finishes twice at both the Yokohama International Women's Ekiden and Beijing International Women's Ekiden.

At national level, she was a four-time winner at the Romanian Cross Country Championships, winning three straight titles from 1985 to 1987 and a final win in 1994. At the Romanian Athletics Championships, she was runner-up over 10,000 metres in 1985 and over 3000 m in 1994. She also had top three finishes in the 3000 m at the 1986 Romanian Indoor Athletics Championships and at the 2001 Romanian Half Marathon Championships. On the professional circuit she won at the 1997 Le Lion Half Marathon and 1998 Belfast International Cross Country. She ran at the Debno Marathon in 1990 but did not take on the distance for a second time, after finishing in eighth in 2:52:51 hours.

International competitions

National titles
Romanian Cross Country Championships: 1985, 1986, 1987, 1994

Circuit wins
Cross Internacional del Calzado: 1997
Le Lion Half Marathon: 1997
Antrim International Cross Country: 1998

Personal bests
800 metres – 2:00.49 (1986)
1500 metres – 4:06.67 (1987)
Mile run – 4:25.52 (1986)
3000 metres – 8:38.83 (1986)
5000 metres – 15:41.36 (1986)
Half marathon – 1:12:36 (1997)
Marathon – 2:52:51 (1990)

References

External links

1964 births
Living people
Romanian female middle-distance runners
Romanian female long-distance runners
Romanian female cross country runners
Romanian female marathon runners
Goodwill Games medalists in athletics
Competitors at the 1986 Goodwill Games
Competitors at the 1987 Summer Universiade
Competitors at the 1991 Summer Universiade